Events from the 2nd century in Roman Britain.

Events
 108
 Legio IX Hispana last definitely known to be in Britain (at Eboracum (York) in what would eventually be northern England).
 118
 Governor Quintus Pompeius Falco suppresses a revolt by the Brigantes.
 c. 120
 Car Dyke constructed over newly drained East Anglian Fens.
 122
 Summer – Emperor Hadrian visits Britain, appoints Aulus Platorius Nepos as governor and orders construction of Hadrian's Wall to begin.
 Construction of forum in Londinium (London) is completed.
 130
 Town centre of Wroxeter redeveloped.
 139
 Newly appointed Governor Quintus Lollius Urbicus advances to the Clyde-Forth line, reconstructing Corstopitum as a base.
 142
 Emperor Antoninus Pius orders the construction of the Antonine Wall across the Central Belt of Scotland.
 154
 Governor Gnaeus Julius Verus suppresses a revolt by the Brigantes.
 Antonine Wall overrun.
 155
Fire destroys much of central Verulamium (St Albans).
 158
 Refortification of Hadrian's Wall begins.
 160
 Antonine Wall reoccupied.
 163
 Antonine Wall abandoned. Governor Sextus Calpurnius Agricola rebuilds forts along Hadrian's Wall.
 175
 5,500 conscripted Sarmatian cavalry stationed in northern Britain.
 180
 Northern tribes breach Hadrian's Wall and ravage the countryside.
 Governor Ulpius Marcellus launches punitive campaigns to the north.
 185
 Marcellus forced to retreat to Hadrian's Wall.
 Roman army in Britain mutinies. Pertinax appointed as governor and suppresses mutiny.
 187
 Pertinax resigns, after becoming unpopular with the army.
 192
 Clodius Albinus, Governor of Britain, briefly proclaimed Emperor, but instead acquiesces to the rival claim of Septimius Severus.
 196
 Albinus proclaims himself "Augustus" and invades Gaul, seeking to overthrow Severus.
 197
 19 February –  Albinus defeated at the Battle of Lugdunum in Gaul; Severus appoints Virius Lupus as governor.
 Maeatae launch raids against Hadrian's Wall.

References

 
British history timelines
Roman Britain
2nd century in the Roman Empire
 
Centuries in Roman Britain